Postumus (Marcus Cassianius Latinius Postumus, died 269) was a Roman usurper and founder of the Gallic Empire.

Postumus may also refer to:
Agrippa Postumus (12 BC – 14 AD), son of Marcus Vipsanius Agrippa
Postumus Junior (died 268), alleged son of the Gallic emperor
Postumus (praenomen), Roman praenomen

See also
Posthumous (disambiguation)